Alma is a religious Jewish moshav in the Upper Galilee in northern Israel. It falls under the jurisdiction of the Merom HaGalil Regional Council. It is built on the basaltic plateau north of Safed.

History

Roman and Crusader periods
Under the Judaea Province, a Jewish town was situated at this spot. The name Alma is first mentioned in the Crusader period. The Jewish community existed until the 17th century. Benjamin of Tudela (1130–1173) said that during his visit, he found 50 Jewish families living in Alma.

Arab village of Alma
The nearby site of the Arab Palestinian village of Alma, whose land Alma stands on, was destroyed in the 1948 Arab–Israeli War.

Modern Alma (1949)
Modern Alma was founded on 1 September 1949 by immigrants to Israel from Libya. In 1953, a group of converts to Judaism, known as the Jews of San Nicandro, arrived from Italy. They later abandoned Alma to live in other nearby moshavim. After the Italians left, Cochin Jews arrived from India. By 1968, Alma's inhabitants were mostly from Libya and Tunisia. The economy is based on hillculture (vineyards, deciduous fruit, vegetables) and cattle. In its early years of development, Alma was associated with Hapoel HaMizrachi.

Archaeology
Near the moshav's cemetery lie the remnants of what has been identified as a synagogue, perhaps dating to the 3rd century, though it has never been systematically excavated or properly researched. Also nearby are several tombs, including those of two prominent Sages (tannaim) of the 1st and 2nd centuries CE, one belonging to Eleazar ben Arach, and one which is traditionally recognized as Eliezer ben Hurcanus' tomb.

Geography
Alma is located about 600 m above sea level, in an area called Alma Heights, bordered by the Dishon Stream. The Dishon Stream Nature Reserve is located next to the village, as well as the Circassian village Rehaniya.

References

Cochin Jews
Indian-Jewish culture in Israel
Moshavim
Populated places in Northern District (Israel)
Populated places established in 1949
1949 establishments in Israel
Libyan-Jewish culture in Israel